Rocca de' Giorgi is a comune (municipality) in the Province of Pavia in the Italian region Lombardy, located about 60 km south of Milan and about 25 km southeast of Pavia. As of 31 December 2004, it had a population of 91 and an area of 10.7 km2.

Rocca de' Giorgi borders the following municipalities: Canevino, Montalto Pavese, Montecalvo Versiggia, Ruino.

Demographic evolution

References

Cities and towns in Lombardy